Prothoe franck, the blue begum, is a butterfly species found in Assam in north-eastern India and throughout a large part of South-East Asia.

It belongs to the leafwings (Charaxinae) in the brush-footed butterflies family.

References

 

Prothoe
Butterflies of Asia
Butterflies of Indochina
Butterflies described in 1824